The 1961 Baltimore Orioles season involved the Orioles finishing 3rd in the American League with a record of 95 wins and 67 losses, 14 games behind the AL and World Series champion New York Yankees. The team was managed by Paul Richards and Lum Harris, and played their home games at Baltimore's Memorial Stadium.

Offseason 
 October 13, 1960: Del Rice was released by the Orioles.
 October 13, 1960: Dave Philley was released by the Orioles.
 January 24, 1961: Bob Boyd, Al Pilarcik, Jim Archer, Wayne Causey, and Clint Courtney were traded by the Orioles to the Kansas City Athletics for Whitey Herzog and Russ Snyder. Clint Courtney was returned to the Orioles on April 14.
 January 31, 1961: Dave Philley was signed as a free agent by the Orioles.
 February 9, 1961: Darold Knowles was signed as an amateur free agent by the Orioles.
 February 24, 1961: Frank House was purchased by the Orioles from the Cincinnati Reds.

Regular season 
Roger Maris of the Yankees hit his 59th and 60th home runs of the season against the Orioles, tying what was at the time Babe Ruth's single-season record. The 59th was hit on September 20 at Memorial Stadium, and the 60th was hit on September 26 at Yankee Stadium.

Opening Day starters
Jackie Brandt
Marv Breeding
Jim Gentile
Ron Hansen
Milt Pappas
Brooks Robinson
Russ Snyder
Gene Stephens
Gus Triandos

Season standings

Record vs. opponents

Notable transactions 
 April 12, 1961: Chuck Essegian and Jerry Walker were traded by the Orioles to the Kansas City Athletics in exchange for Dick Hall and Dick Williams.
 May 24, 1961: Walt Dropo was released by the Orioles.
 June 8, 1961: Gene Stephens was traded by the Orioles to the Kansas City Athletics for Marv Throneberry.
 July 21, 1961: Frank House was traded by the Orioles to the Detroit Tigers for Harry Chiti.

Roster

Player stats

Batting

Starters by position 
Note: Pos = Position; G = Games played; AB = At bats; H = Hits; Avg. = Batting average; HR = Home runs; RBI = Runs batted in

Other batters 
Note: G = Games played; AB = At bats; H = Hits; Avg. = Batting average; HR = Home runs; RBI = Runs batted in

Pitching

Starting pitchers 
Note: G = Games pitched; IP = Innings pitched; W = Wins; L = Losses; ERA = Earned run average; SO = Strikeouts

Other pitchers 
Note: G = Games pitched; IP = Innings pitched; W = Wins; L = Losses; ERA = Earned run average; SO = Strikeouts

Relief pitchers 
Note: G = Games pitched; W = Wins; L = Losses; SV = Saves; ERA = Earned run average; SO = Strikeouts

Farm system 

LEAGUE CHAMPIONS: AberdeenVictoria club moved to Ardmore, May 27, 1961

Notes

References 

1961 Baltimore Orioles team page at Baseball Reference
1961 Baltimore Orioles season at baseball-almanac.com

Baltimore Orioles seasons
Baltimore Orioles season
Baltimore Orioles